Clostera anastomosis is a moth of the family Notodontidae. It is found in the  Palearctic realm.

The wingspan is 30–40 mm.

The larvae feed on willow and poplar.

External links

Fauna Europaea
Lepiforum.de
Vlindernet.nl 

Notodontidae
Moths described in 1758
Moths of Japan
Moths of Europe
Taxa named by Carl Linnaeus